The Tennessee–Alabama League was an independent minor league baseball league which operated in the United States in 1904. Eight teams from Tennessee and Alabama competed in the league.

Teams
A total of 8 teams competed in the Tennessee–Alabama League. Cities represented were:

Anniston, Alabama: Anniston
Bessemer, Alabama: Bessemer
Chattanooga, Tennessee: Chattanooga
Columbia, Tennessee: Columbia
Decatur, Alabama: Decatur
Huntsville, Alabama: Huntsville
Knoxville, Tennessee: Knoxville
Sheffield, Alabama: Sheffield

Standings & statistics 

1904 Tennessee-Alabama League
 Anniston and Bessemer disbanded July 9

Notable players
Five players from the league also played on Major League Baseball teams. They are:

King Bailey (Columbia)
Ty Cobb (Anniston)
Jim Holmes (Huntsville)
Pryor McElveen (Knoxville)
Tom Stouch (Decatur)

References
General

Johnson, Lloyd, and Wolff, Miles, eds., The Encyclopedia of Minor League Baseball, 3rd edition. Durham, North Carolina: Baseball America, 2007.
Specific

Defunct minor baseball leagues in the United States
Baseball leagues in Alabama
Baseball leagues in Tennessee
Sports leagues established in 1904
Sports leagues disestablished in 1904